Bozeat Meadow is a  biological Site of Special Scientific Interest in Bozeat, east of Northampton.

This is unimproved grassland on well drained clay and loam soils. It has medieval ridge and furrow and diverse flora, including crested dog's-tail, downy oat-grass, quaking grass and dwarf thistle. There are also mature hedgerows and a spring.

The site is private land with no public access.

References

Sites of Special Scientific Interest in Northamptonshire